was one of the administrative divisions of Taiwan during the Japanese era. The prefecture consisted of modern-day Hsinchu City, Hsinchu County, Taoyuan City, and Miaoli County.

Population
1941 (Showa 16) census
Total population: 838,011
Japanese 20,693
Taiwanese 815,274
Korean 150
Other 1,894

Administrative divisions

Cities and districts
In 1945 (Showa 20), there were 1 cities and 8 districts under Shinchiku Prefecture.

Towns and villages
The districts are divided into towns (街) and villages (庄)

Shintō shrines

Shinchiku Shrine
Tsūshō Shrine
Tōen Shrine (now Taoyuan County Martyr's Shrine)
Byōritsu Shrine
Chūreki Shrine
Tōfun Shrine
Chikunan Shrine
Taigo Shrine
Chikutō Shrine

National Parks

Tsugitaka Taroko National Park (established 12 December 1937)

Famous people
List of notable people born in Shinchiku Prefecture during Japanese rule:
Peter Huang 黄文雄 (independence activist, social commentator in Japan, chairman of Amnesty International Taiwan in the late 2000s) (born 2 October 1937)
Sheu Yuan-dong 許遠東 (politician, 14th governor of Taiwan's central bank) (born 22 May 1927, died 16 February 1998 in the crash of China Airlines Flight 676)

See also
Political divisions of Taiwan (1895-1945)
Governor-General of Taiwan
Taiwan under Japanese rule
Administrative divisions of the Republic of China
Hsinchu
Taoyuan City
Hsinchu County
Miaoli County

Former prefectures of Japan in Taiwan